Romano Maria La Russa (born 11 January 1952 in Paternò)
is an Italian politician and
Member of the European Parliament
for North-West
with the Alleanza Nazionale, part of the Union for a Europe of Nations and
sits on
the European Parliament's Committee on Civil Liberties, Justice and Home Affairs.

He is a substitute for the Committee on Economic and Monetary Affairs, a vice-chair
of the Delegation for relations with Iran and a substitute for the
Delegation for relations with the Gulf States, including Yemen.

Education
 Secondary school-leaving certificate
 Member of the AN national party executive

Career
 1990-2004: Municipal Councillor of Cinisello Balsamo (Milan) (1985-1990) and of Sesto San Giovanni (Milan)
 1995-2004: AN group leader in the Regional Government
 1995-2004: Member of the Regional Executive

See also
2004 European Parliament election in Italy

External links
 

1952 births
Living people
People from Paternò
National Alliance (Italy) politicians
The People of Freedom politicians
Brothers of Italy politicians
National Alliance (Italy) MEPs
MEPs for Italy 2004–2009
21st-century Italian politicians
Politicians from the Province of Catania